Bala Larijan Rural District is a rural district (dehestan) in Larijan District, Amol County, Mazandaran Province, Iran. At the 2006 census, its population was 4,043, in 1,169 families. The rural district has 36 villages.

References 

Rural Districts of Mazandaran Province
Amol County